The Silver Jubilee Album is a compilation album credited to Judith Durham and The Seekers. It celebrates the 25th anniversary of the band's final performance in 1968.
"Keep A Dream In Your Pocket" and "One World Love" are new tracks recorded in December 1992. All other tracks were recorded between 1964 and 1968.

Track listing
 "I'll Never Find Another You" (Tom Springfield) – 2:48
 "A World of Our Own" (Tom Springfield) – 2:40
 "We Shall Not Be Moved" (trad.) – 2:46
 "When the Stars Begin to Fall" (Athol Guy / Keith Potger / Bruce Woodley) – 3:07
 "Someday One Day" – 2:32
 "Colours of My Life" (Judith Durham / David Reilly) – 2:39
 "Red Rubber Ball" (Paul Simon / Bruce Woodley) – 2:48
 "Walk with Me" (Tom Springfield) – 3:00
 "Kumbaya" (Athol Guy / Keith Potger / Bruce Woodley) – 2:34
 "Island of Dreams" (Tom Springfield) – 2:27
 "The Times They Are a-Changin'" (Bob Dylan) – 2:24
 "Morningtown Ride" (Malvina Reynolds) – 2:39
 "This Land Is Your Land" (Woody Guthrie) – 2:42
 "This Little Light of Mine" (Avis Burgeon Christiansen, Harry Dixon Loes) – 2:15
 "Keep a Dream in Your Pocket" (Bruce Woodley) – 3:16
 "One World Love" (Judith Durham) – 3:09
 "Love Is Kind, Love Is Wine" – 2:25
 "Georgy Girl" (Jim Dale / Tom Springfield) – 2:19
 "On the Other Side" (Tom Springfield, Gary Osbourne, Bob Sage) – 2:11
 "When Will the Good Applies Fall" (Kenny Young) – 2:25
 "Emerald City" (Keith Potger, Kim Fowley) – 2:37
 "All I Can Remember" (Keith Potger) – 2:00
 "Myra" – 1:57
 "Isa Lei (Fijian Farewell)" (Caten) – 3:41
 "The Carnival Is Over" (Tom Springfield) – 3:09

Charts

Weekly charts

Year-end charts

Certifications

References

External links
 "The Silver Jubilee Album" at discogs.com

Judith Durham compilation albums
The Seekers compilation albums
1993 compilation albums
EMI Records compilation albums
EMI Music Australia albums